Lai Blos or Lais Blos are two small lakes on Alp Flix, at an elevation of 1960 m, in the Grisons, Switzerland. They are located near to Lai Neir.

The alp is listed in the Inventory of Mire Landscapes of Particular Beauty and National Importance.

External links

Lakes of Switzerland
Lakes of Graubünden
Surses